Adrien Richard Sturt (born 2 May 1986) is an Australian-British professional basketball player. He previously played for the Great Britain Under-23 team.

High school and college
After graduating from Box Hill Senior Secondary College in 2006, Sturt attended Utah's Snow College in 2006–07 where he helped the team win the SWAC Conference Championship.

Professional career
Sturt returned to Australia in 2007 and joined the Melbourne Tigers, where he played two seasons and won an NBL championship in his rookie season. He also played for the Tigers' affiliate team in the Big V, where he won championships in 2008 and 2009.

In April 2010, Sturt signed with Dexia Mons-Hainaut of Belgium for the rest of the 2009–10 season. Later that year, he signed with the Essex Pirates for the 2010–11 British Basketball League season. In 31 games for the Pirates, he averaged 10.9 points, 5.9 rebounds, 1.3 assists and 1.1 steals per game.

In March 2011, Sturt signed with the Eltham Wildcats for the 2011 Big V season.

Sturt moved to England for the 2011–12 season, signing with the Milton Keynes Lions of the British Basketball League. In 27 games for the Lions, he averaged 9.7 points, 5.8 rebounds and 1.4 assists per game. Following the BBL season, he returned to Australia and joined the Ringwood Hawks for the 2012 Big V season.

In August 2012, the Milton Keynes Lions moved to London and thus became the London Lions. Sturt subsequently joined the London Lions for the 2012–13 British Basketball League season. In 32 games for the Lions, he averaged 13.6 points, 6.4 rebounds, 1.2 assists and 1.4 blocks per game. Following the BBL season, he joined the Bulleen Boomers for the 2013 Big V season.

On 29 July 2013, Sturt re-signed with the London Lions for the 2013–14 British Basketball League season. In 34 games for the Lions, he averaged 10.8 points and 5.9 rebounds per game.

On 11 September 2014, Sturt again re-signed with the Lions for the 2014–15 British Basketball League season. On 18 November 2014, he was released by the Lions after appearing in the first six games of the season. Eight days later, he signed with the Cheshire Phoenix for the rest of the season. In 28 games for the Phoenix, he averaged 6.6 points and 5.1 rebounds per game.

On 9 November 2015, Sturt signed with the Plymouth Raiders for the rest of the 2015–16 British Basketball League season.

In 2018, Sturt joined the Waverley Falcons of the Big V. In 2019, he joined the Ringwood Hawks of the Senior Elite League.

References

External links
Eurobasket.com profile
BBL stats
NBL stats

1986 births
Living people
Australian expatriate basketball people in the United States
Australian men's basketball players
Belfius Mons-Hainaut players
Centers (basketball)
Cheshire Phoenix players
Essex Leopards players
Junior college men's basketball players in the United States
Melbourne Tigers players
London Lions (basketball) players
Plymouth Raiders players
Snow Badgers men's basketball players
Basketball players from Adelaide
Australian expatriate basketball people in England
Australian expatriate basketball people in Belgium
Sportsmen from South Australia